Series 2041 is a diesel-electric locomotive class on Croatian Railways.

These locomotives are built for hauling lighter freight trains, lighter passenger trains and also for heavy shunting.

External links

 2041 at zeljeznice.net (in Croatian)

Bo′Bo′ locomotives
2041
Đuro Đaković (company)
Brissonneau and Lotz locomotives
Standard gauge locomotives of Croatia
Diesel-electric locomotives of Yugoslavia